Constanza Valdés is a trans female Chilean political activist and parliamentary advisor.

She became the spokesperson for Broad Front in June 2017, making her the first trans spokesperson for a political organization. She supported a 2017 Gender Identity Law in Chile which simplifies the procedure for trans people to change their name and sex, though she criticized it for not going far enough.

Valdés was the legal advisor for Chilean group Organizing Trans-Diversities, an advocacy group for trans rights. She is currently an adviser to Chilean politician . Valdés is a member of the Chilean Pirate Party.

Valdés studied law at Diego Portales University. In an interview with Qué Pasa, she stated that she knew her gender identity when she was 18, but it took her five years to publicly identify as female, fearing it would cause her problems at university. She changed her legal name and sex on April 21, 2016. In a 2017 interview, Valdés said that she did not want hormone therapy or surgery, and described herself as a feminist.

References

Further reading
 Constanza Valdés, activista trans: "Espero que la ola feminista se transforme en un tsunami"
 #VíaInclusiva: ¿Qué recomendaron los invitados para seguir aprendiendo sobre diversidad sexual y de género?

Year of birth missing (living people)
Living people
Chilean LGBT politicians
Political activists
Transgender women
20th-century Chilean women
21st-century Chilean politicians
21st-century Chilean women politicians
21st-century Chilean LGBT people
Commons (political party) politicians